The Norway men's national under-18 ice hockey team is the men's national under-18 ice hockey team of Norway. The team is controlled by the Norwegian Ice Hockey Association, a member of the International Ice Hockey Federation. The team represents Norway at the IIHF World U18 Championships.

International competitions

IIHF World U18 Championships

1999: 10th place
2000: 1st in Pool B
2001: 9th place
2002: 11th place
2003: 1st in Division I Group B
2004: 10th place
2005: 1st in Division I Group B

2006: 10th place
2007: 3rd in Division I Group B
2008: 1st in Division I Group B
2009: 9th place
2010: 1st in Division I Group A
2011: 9th place
2012: 2nd in Division I Group A

External links
Norway at IIHF.com

under
National under-18 ice hockey teams